Emmeline Raymond (1828-1902) was a French journalist and editor. She was the founder and manager editor of the internationally successful fashion magazine La Mode Illustrée (1860-1902).  She was a woman pioneer within French fashion journalism, since the French fashion press had until then been dominated by male editors and journalists.

References

1828 births
1902 deaths
19th-century French journalists
19th-century publishers (people)
French fashion journalists
French businesspeople in fashion